Myxosargus fasciatus is a species of soldier fly in the family Stratiomyidae.

Distribution
United States, Guatemala, Mexico, Panama.

References

Stratiomyidae
Insects described in 1882
Diptera of North America
Taxa named by Friedrich Moritz Brauer